Dandi Daley Mackall is an American author with around 500 of her works published for adults and children. Some of her works are the Winnie the Horse Gentler series and the Flipside Stories, The Silence of Murder, and With Love, Wherever You Are, a novel based on the stories and letters of her parents, Army doctor and Army nurse in World War II, as well as many others. She collaborated with Sigmund Brouwer and Melody Carlson to take part in creating the Degrees of Guilt series and then with Jeff Nesbit and Melody Carlson in the Degrees of Betrayal series. Other animal series include Backyard Horses, Starlight Animal Rescue, Bob the Horse, and I Can Read series.

Biography 
Mackall started her writing career when at ten years of age she entered and won her first writing contest in 1959. Her paper was titled "Why I Want to be Batboy for the Kansas City A's". Since then, she has published over 450 books for adults, teens, and children. She now lives with her husband, Joe, in Ohio. They have three children: Jen, Katy, and Dan. Mackall continues to appear on radio broadcasts, and has made several appearances on TV as well.

The Silence of Murder won the Edgar Award for Best Young Adult Mystery of 2012. Larger-Than-Life Lara was a finalist for the William Allen White Award, Kentucky Bluegrass Award, and the Delaware Diamond. Ms. Mackall won the Distinguished Alumni Award from the University of Missouri and the Helen Keating Ott Award for Distinguished Contribution to Children's Literature. Her novel, My Boyfriends' Dogs, was turned into a Hallmark movie and became the most-watched original Hallmark movie of 2014.

Bibliography

Children's books 
A Girl Named Dan 
Rudy Rides the Rails
The Legend of Ohio
Dandelion Rhymes
Seeing Stars
In the Beginning
Who's a Goblin?
Are We There Yet?
Silent Dreams
First Day
Made For A Purpose
Off To Plymouth Rock!
Journey, Easter Journey!
I'm Not Afraid Series
A Friend From Galilee
This is the Lunch that Jesus Served
My Favorite Verses Series
Must Be Halloween
Easter is for Me
Who'll Light the Chanukah Candles?
Joseph King of Dreams Christmas Picture Books
The Shepherd's Christmas Story                                       m

Teen's books 
Crazy In Love
Larger Than-Life Lara
Eva Underground
Our Marriage
Love Rules
Maggie's Story
Winnie the Horse Gentler Series
Horsefeathers!
Starlight Animal Rescue
Blog On!
Sierra's Story: Degrees of Betrayal
Kyra's Story: Degrees of Guilt
Career Skills Series
Horse Files
My Boyfriend's Dogs
Backyard Horses
The Silence of Murder
The Secrets of Tree Taylor

Adult's books 
With Love, Wherever You Are, a Novel
Maggie
Love Rules
Kindred Sisters
Kids Say The Best Things About Life
Kids Say The Best Things About God
Kids Are Still Saying the Darndest Things
Kids Say the Greatest Things about God
Kids Say the Cutest Things About Moms
Kids Say the Cutest Things About Dads
Why I Believe in God
What Children Know About Angels
When the Answer Is No
Just One of Me
The Blessing Is in the Doing
Kids' Rules for Life
101 Ways to Talk to God
God Created Me!

Publishers 
Prentice-Hall
Simon & Schuster
Dutton/Penguin-Putnam
HarperCollins
Harcourt
Random House/WaterBrook
DreamWorks
Tyndale House
Tommy Nelson
Standard Publishing
Jossey-Bass
Broadman
Shaw
Concordia Publishing House
William B. Eerdmans Publishing Company
Honor Books
Augsburg-Fortress
Mc-Graw-Hill/Children's Specialty
Landoll's
Prima/St. Martin's
Ferguson
John Wiley & Sons
Sourcebooks
Disney
Warner Brothers
Hanna Barbera

External links 

Dandi at Penguin Random House

Year of birth missing (living people)
Living people
American women writers
Edgar Award winners
21st-century American women